Eudactylota is a genus of moths in the family Gelechiidae.

Species
 Eudactylota abstemia Hodges, 1966
 Eudactylota barberella (Busck, 1903)
 Eudactylota diadota Hodges, 1966
 Eudactylota iobapta (Meyrick, 1927)

References

Gelechiini